Elgin Burghs  was a district of burghs constituency of the House of Commons of Great Britain from 1708 to 1801 and of the House of Commons of the United Kingdom from 1801 to 1918. Until 1832, when Peterhead was added, the constituency comprised the parliamentary burghs of Elgin, Cullen, Banff, Inverurie and Kintore, lying in Elginshire (later known as Morayshire), Banffshire and Aberdeenshire.

Creation
The British parliamentary constituency was created in 1708 following the Acts of Union, 1707 and replaced the former Parliament of Scotland burgh constituencies of Elgin, Banff, Cullen, Inverurie and Kintore.

History
The constituency elected one Member of Parliament (MP) by the first past the post system until the seat was abolished in 1918.

In 1918, Elgin became part of Moray and Nairn, Banff and Cullen part of Banffshire, Inverurie and Kintore part of Kincardine and Aberdeenshire West and Peterhead part of East Aberdeen and Kincardine.

Members of Parliament

Election results

Elections in the 1830s

Hay was appointed as Clerk of the Ordnance, requiring a by-election.

Hay was appointed as Clerk of the Ordnance, requiring a by-election.

Hay resigned after being appointed as Governor of Bermuda, causing a by-election.

Elections in the 1840s

Elections in the 1850s

Duff resigned by accepting the office of Steward of the Chiltern Hundreds, causing a by-election.

Elections in the 1860s

Elections in the 1870s

Elections in the 1880s

Duff resigned after being appointed Governor of Madras, causing a by-election.

Asher was appointed as Solicitor General for Scotland, requiring a by-election.

Asher was re-appointed as Solicitor General for Scotland, requiring a by-election.

Elections in the 1890s 

Asher is appointed Solicitor General for Scotland, requiring a by-election.

Elections in the 1900s

Elections in the 1910s

See also 
Elgin Burghs by-election, 1918

References 

Historic parliamentary constituencies in Scotland (Westminster)
Constituencies of the Parliament of the United Kingdom established in 1708
Constituencies of the Parliament of the United Kingdom disestablished in 1918
Politics of the county of Aberdeen
Politics of the county of Banff
Politics of Moray